The Contract (Chinese: 賣身契) is a 1978 Hong Kong comedy film written, directed by and starring Michael Hui. The film also co-stars Hui's brothers, Samuel Hui and Ricky Hui. It was very successful at the Hong Kong box office being the second-highest-grossing film there at the time.

Cast
Michael Hui as Sit Chi-man
Samuel Hui as Chiu Sai-kit
Ricky Hui as Sit Chi-ying
Tiffany Bao as Ms. Wang
Ellen Lau as Chu Ling-ling
Yeung Wai as Ms. Wang's eye-path assistant
Cheng Fu-hing as King Kong
Russell Cawthorne as Guru
Chan King-cheung as MTV chairman
Cheng Siu-ping as Mrs. Li
Kwong Kwan-ning as Mr. Kwong
Lee Pang-fei as Cat TV manager
Chiu Chun as MTV board of director
Fong Yue as Woman coming out of elevator
Huang Pa-ching as Mrs. Li
Man Sau as Man's mother
Pan Yung-sheng as Audience for alien show
Kwan Yan as Audience at magic show
Cheung Sek-Au as Audience at magic show
Johnny Koo as one of three bank robbers
Kam Tin-chue as MTV board of director
Si Lau-wa
Lau Cheun
Hoh Wan

Reception 
The Contract was a commercial success, earning HK$7,820,019 at the box office, making it the second highest-grossing films in Hong Kong at the time, behind only the Hui brothers' last film, The Private Eyes.

In The Hong Kong Filmography, 1977-1997, John Charles described The Contract as "totally disarming and one of The Hui's Brothers most consistently amusing efforts" while Stephen Teo in his book Hong Kong Cinema: the Extra Dimensions wrote "Michael Hui ended the decade with arguably his best film".

The film was nominated for three Golden Horse Awards in 1978, and was Michael Hui's first and last nomination for a Golden Horse Award, until his nomination for Best Actor for his work in the 2016 film Godspeed at the 53rd Golden Horse Awards.

Accolades

Album 
The Contract is Sam Hui's fifth Cantopop album with the title track being the film's theme song. In Asia soundtrack has shifted 500,000 units.

Track listing 
 "賣身契"
 "舞伴"
 "男兒漢"
 "世事如棋"
 "應該要自愛"
 "人生的道路"
 "學生哥"
 "杯酒當歌"
 "拜拜"
 "相思萬千重"
 "飲勝"
 "父母恩"
 "太空舞"（音樂）

References

External links 
 

1978 films
1978 comedy films
Hong Kong slapstick comedy films
1970s Cantonese-language films
Golden Harvest films
Films directed by Michael Hui
Films about actors
Films about television
Films set in Hong Kong
Films shot in Hong Kong
1970s Hong Kong films